BSES may refer to
 BSES Expeditions, a youth development charity based in the United Kingdom.
 Reliance Energy, formerly known as Bombay Suburban Electric Supply (BSES).
BSES Yamuna Power Limited